Harry "Light Horse" Wilson (August 6, 1902 – October 26, 1990) was an American football, basketball, and lacrosse player. He was elected to the College Football Hall of Fame in 1973. He was elected to the National Lacrosse Hall of Fame in 1963. While at West Point he earned a record 12 varsity letters in football, basketball, and lacrosse.

Career

Career in sports
Harry E. Wilson played football, basketball and lacrosse at Pennsylvania State University. He was known as "Light Horse Harry". He was All-American at the U.S. Military Academy. He was inducted into the College Football Hall of Fame in 1973 and is a member of the National Lacrosse Hall of Fame.

Other career
Wilson served in World War II. He was a part of the United States Air Force and retired as a colonel.

Personal life
Wilson married Patricia. They had three daughters, Patricia M., Mary and Margaret.

Later in life, Wilson lived in Smyrna Beach, Florida. He died on October 26, 1990. He was buried at St. Mary's Cemetery in Sharon, Pennsylvania.

References

External links

1902 births
1990 deaths
American football halfbacks
Army Black Knights football players
Army Black Knights men's basketball players
Army Black Knights men's lacrosse players
Penn State Nittany Lions football players
All-American college football players
All-American college men's basketball players
College Football Hall of Fame inductees
People from Mingo Junction, Ohio
American men's basketball players
American military personnel of World War II
United States Air Force colonels